Rain Down may refer to:
"Rain Down" (song), a 2003 song by Delirious? from the album World Service
 Rain Down (album), a 2000 album by Alvin Slaughter